Russula crassotunicata is a North American fungus in the mushroom genus Russula, described by Rolf Singer in 1938 from a collection made in Washington state, United States.

The species is mostly white and often grows on rotted wood. It has been confirmed as a host of the parasitic fungus Dendrocollybia racemosa.

See also
List of Russula species

References

External links
 
 
 Description at Roger's Mushrooms
 Trial field key to the species of Russula in the Pacific Northwest

crassotunicata
Fungi described in 1938
Fungi of North America
Taxa named by Rolf Singer